= Papirion =

Town of ancient Cilicia

Coordinates: 36°55′08″N 32°50′27″E

Papirion (Ancient Greek: Παπιρίον), also called Papiriou Castellum and Cherreos Eryma, was a town of ancient Cilicia, inhabited in Byzantine times.

Its site is located near Bağdad Kırı, Asiatic Turkey.
